Joanne Banning (born 25 February 1977 in New South Wales) is a female field hockey striker from Australia, who made her debut for the Australian women's national team during the Argentina Tour in 2001. Nicknamed Joey she was a member of the Hockeyroos at the 2002 Commonwealth Games in Manchester, where the team ended up in third place in the overall-rankings.

References
 Profile Australia Hockey

1977 births
Living people
Australian female field hockey players
Field hockey players at the 2002 Commonwealth Games
Commonwealth Games bronze medallists for Australia
People from New South Wales
Commonwealth Games medallists in field hockey
Medallists at the 2002 Commonwealth Games